Clypeaster japonicus, the Japanese sea biscuit, is a species of sea urchin in the Family Clypeasteridae. This species was first scientifically described in 1885 by the German zoologist Ludwig Heinrich Philipp Döderlein.

Description
In shape it is an elongated pentagon, the aboral (upper) surface slightly higher at the apex than at the margins. The length of the petaloid area amounts to two thirds or more of the total length of the test. The anterior petal is open distally while the two posterior, paired petals are closed distally. The oral (under) surface is fairly flat, but deeply concave around the mouth, with conspicuous, but short, indented food grooves. The anus is on the oral surface near the posterior margin. The primary spines are rather longer than the densely felted secondary spines. When alive, this species is a uniform brown colour apart from the petals, which are a darker brown. The bare test is grey or pale brown.

Distribution
This sea biscuit is endemic to Japanese waters. Its range extends from northern Honshu southwards to southern Kyushu.

References 

Animals described in 1885
Clypeaster